Al-Otrush Mosque also known as Demirdash Mosque, is a mosque in the Syrian city of Aleppo, located at the south of the Citadel, in "al-A'jam" district of the Ancient City, few meters away from Al-Sultaniyah Madrasa. It was built at the end of the 14th century by the efforts of the Mamluk ruler of Aleppo; Aqbogha al-Otrush. However, the mosque was completed by his successor Demirdash al-Nasiri.

The mosque is famous for its decorated façade and its entrance which is topped with traditional oriental motifs and Islamic muqarnas. The minaret of the mosque located to the left of the main entrance, has a round octangular shape.

The mosque was renovated in 1922.

Gallery

See also
 Al-Sultaniyah Madrasa

References

Mamluk architecture in Syria
Mamluk mosques in Syria 
Mosques in Aleppo
Mausoleums in Syria
14th-century mosques
Religious buildings and structures completed in 1398